Wilhelm Tiefel (14 July 1911 – 28 August 1941), nicknamed Willi, was a German footballer.

He played for the teams Union Niederrad, Eintracht Frankfurt, Berliner SV 92 and BSC Brandenburg. He also played 7 times for Germany, starting in 1935.

Personal life
Tiefel was born in Frankfurt on 14 July 1911. He fought in World War II as a private in the German army, and died on 28 August 1941 in Narva on the Eastern Front at the age of 30.

References

External links
  Willi Tiefel at eintracht-archiv.de

1911 births
1941 deaths
Footballers from Frankfurt
German footballers
Germany international footballers
Eintracht Frankfurt players
German Army personnel killed in World War II
Association football midfielders
German Army soldiers of World War II
Military personnel from Frankfurt